Storror (stylized as STORROR) is a group of seven parkour and freerunning athletes from Britain. They have produced two documentaries and run a YouTube channel that has over 7 million subscribers and 1 billion views.

History
Storror was established in 2010 by seven parkour athletes from Horsham (West Sussex), and Peacehaven (East Sussex) who met as teenagers. The team started with the Cave brothers and Drew Taylor, who were inspired by Jump London (2003) and Jump Britain (2005) documentaries. They began uploading videos to their YouTube channel, originally called StorrorBlog. They later met other members of British parkour communities and in 2010 established the Storror group and YouTube channel.

In 2011 and 2012, the team filmed two cliff jumping videos in Malta that included jumps from Azure Window. In 2016, team member Max Cave leaped between the roofs of two Hong Kong skyscrapers and uploaded it to Instagram. They also filmed several other videos in Hong Kong which were published later.

In May 2017, Storror apologized for stunts performed at Joshua Tree National Park.

In September 2017, the team released their second documentary (the first being SuperTramps: Thailand) Roof Culture Asia, which features stunts made on the rooftops of Hong Kong, Tokyo and Seoul. They monetized this video through Vimeo. Storror made their feature film debut in Netflix's 6 Underground, released on 13 December 2019. They worked closely with director Michael Bay to perform parkour stunts on famous sites, such as the Florence Cathedral in Italy.

Media appearances 
In December 2019, the team joined actor Ben Hardy on the red carpet of the New York premiere of 6 Underground.

In winter 2018, Drew Taylor appeared in adverts for Italian sportswear brand Ellesse alongside actress Jessica Barden.

In June 2018, the team shot and starred in a global campaign for Canon filmed in Istanbul, Turkey.

In December 2017, the team flew to Singapore with Asics to lead parkour workshops and demonstrations.

Toby Segar appeared on ITV show Ninja Warrior UK in 2015, 2016 and 2019.

Team members 

As of January 2023, the Storror team are:
 Max Cave (born 23 December 1991)
 Benj Cave (born 28 January 1994)
 Drew Taylor (born 25 July 1994), Guinness world record holder
 Toby Segar (born 21 July 1994), Ninja Warrior UK finalist in 2015 and 2016
 Callum Powell (born 8 August 1991)
 Sacha Powell (born 16 June 1994)
 Josh Burnett-Blake (born 13 February 1992)

References

External links
 Official STORROR website
 Storror YouTube channel

Traceurs
English YouTubers
2010 establishments in the United Kingdom
English YouTube groups